This is a list of active Portuguese Navy ships.

In total there are 36 military ships commissioned in the Navy. Portuguese Navy also operates 43 auxiliary military vessels, known as Unidade Auxiliar da Marinha (UAM).

Submarines

Frigates

Corvettes

Patrol Vessels

Research Vessels

Sailing Vessels

Unmanned vessels 

 Sistema Marítimo Autónomo Hidrográfico X-2601;
 Sistema Marítimo Autónomo X-2701;
 Sistema Marítimo Autónomo X-2801;

Auxiliary vessels 
Portuguese Navy also has a total of 44 auxiliary vessels, locally known as "Unidade Auxiliar da Marinha", this vessels belong to Maritime Authority System.
 12 lifesaving vessels;
 12 captaincy/patrol vessels;
 20 other vessels, such as armed speedboats belonging to Portuguese Marine Corps and anti pollution boats.

Future procurement 
Ships that are in the process of acquisition:

 1 amphibious transport dock vessel – locally known has Navio Polivalente Logístico (NPL);
 1 landing platform - to operate unmanned aerial vehicles and unmanned underwater vehicles;
 1 replenishment oiler – to replace Berrio-class fleet tanker;
 6 Viana do Castelo-class patrol vessels.

Armament

See also
Lisbon Naval Base
Portuguese Marine Corps
Portuguese Naval Aviation
Academia de Marinha
Navy Museum
 Currently active military equipment by country

References

External links
Official website of the Portuguese Navy  (Portuguese)

Ships of the Portuguese Navy
Naval ships of Portugal
Navy ships
Portuguese Navy
Military of Portugal